Agathon son of Tyrimmas was the Macedonian commander of Thracian cavalry during Alexander's campaign. He played a role in the elimination of Parmenion but later he was executed by Alexander.

References
Who's who in the Age of Alexander the Great: Prosopography of Alexander's Empire Page 7 By Waldemar Heckel 

Ancient Greek generals
Ancient Macedonian generals
4th-century BC Macedonians